The 59th Academy Awards ceremony, organized by the Academy of Motion Picture Arts and Sciences (AMPAS), took place on March 30, 1987, at the Dorothy Chandler Pavilion in Los Angeles beginning at 6:00 p.m. PST / 9:00 p.m. EST. During the ceremony, AMPAS presented Academy Awards (commonly referred to as Oscars) in 23 categories honoring films released in 1986. The ceremony, televised in the United States by ABC, was produced by Samuel Goldwyn Jr. and directed by Marty Pasetta. Actors Chevy Chase, Paul Hogan, and Goldie Hawn co-hosted the show. Hawn hosted the gala for the second time, having previously been a co-host of the 48th ceremony held in 1976. Meanwhile, this was Chase and Hogan's first Oscars hosting stint. Eight days earlier, in a ceremony held at The Beverly Hilton in Beverly Hills, California, on March 22, the Academy Awards for Technical Achievement were presented by host Catherine Hicks.

Platoon won four awards, including Best Picture. Other winners included Hannah and Her Sisters and A Room with a View with three awards, Aliens with two, and Artie Shaw: Time Is All You've Got, The Assault, Children of a Lesser God, The Color of Money, Down and Out in America, The Fly, A Greek Tragedy, The Mission, Precious Images, Round Midnight, Top Gun, and Women – for America, for the World with one.

Winners and nominees

The nominees for the 59th Academy Awards were announced on February 11, 1987, at the Samuel Goldwyn Theater in Beverly Hills, California, by Robert Wise, president of the Academy, actor Don Ameche, and actress Anjelica Huston. Platoon and A Room with a View led all nominees with eight each.

The winners were announced during the awards ceremony on March 30, 1987. Marlee Matlin was the first deaf performer to win an Oscar and the youngest winner in the Best Actress category. Best Actor winner Paul Newman was the fourth actor to have been nominated for portraying the same character in two different films, having previously earned a nomination for his role as "Fast Eddie" Felson in 1961's The Hustler. By virtue of his victory in the Best Actor category, Newman and wife Joanne Woodward, who won Best Actress for her performance in 1957's The Three Faces of Eve, became the second married couple to win acting Oscars. Artie Shaw: Time Is All You've Got and Down and Out in Americas joint win in the Best Documentary Feature category marked the fourth occurrence of a tie in Oscar history.

Awards

Winners are listed first, highlighted in boldface and indicated with a double dagger.

Honorary Academy Awards
Ralph Bellamy

Irving G. Thalberg Memorial Award
Steven Spielberg

Multiple nominations and awards

The following 15 films had multiple nominations:

The following four films received multiple awards.

Presenters and performers
The following individuals presented awards or performed musical numbers.

Presenters

Performers

Ceremony information

Determined to revive interest surrounding the awards and reverse declining ratings, the Academy hired Samuel Goldwyn Jr. in November 1986 to produce the telecast for the first time. The following March, Goldwyn announced that comedian Chevy Chase, actress and Academy Award winner Goldie Hawn, and actor and Best Original Screenplay nominee Paul Hogan would share co-hosting duties for the 1987 ceremony. Actor Robin Williams was initially named a co-host, but he was forced to withdraw from emceeing duties due to his commitment toward his role in the upcoming film Good Morning, Vietnam.

One of the biggest priorities for Goldwyn was to shorten the length of the show to at least three hours or less. In view of his goal, he told reporters regarding winner's acceptance speeches, "We are actually going to give them 45 seconds. The light (next to the camera) will start blinking at 45 seconds and go red at 55 seconds. After one minute we will either cut to a commercial or go to something else. We've also asked multiple winners to flip a coin and pick a spokesman." Furthermore, instead of each Best Original Song nominee being performed separately, all five songs were performed as part of a musical number featuring actress Bernadette Peters singing brief introductions to each one. Although Goldwyn attempted to move the Documentary and Short Film Categories to a separate ceremony from the broadcast, the AMPAS Board of Governors refused to do so.

Several other people were involved with the production of the ceremony. Oscar-winning costume designer Theoni V. Aldredge was hired as fashion consultant for the awards ceremony and supervised a "fashion show" segment showcasing the five nominees for Best Costume Design. Lionel Newman served as musical director and conductor for the ceremony. Actors Dom DeLuise, Pat Morita, and Telly Savalas performed the song "Fugue for Tinhorns" from the musical Guys and Dolls at the start of the ceremony.

Box office performance of nominated films
At the time of the nominations announcement on February 11, the combined gross of the five Best Picture nominees at the US box office was $119 million with an average of $23.9 million. Platoon was the highest earner among the Best Picture nominees with $39.3 million in the domestic box office receipts. The film was followed by Hannah and Her Sisters ($35.4 million), Children of a Lesser God ($22.1 million), A Room with a View ($11.5 million), and The Mission ($11.1 million).

Of the 50 grossing movies of the year, 55 nominations went to 18 films on the list. Only Crocodile Dundee (2nd), Aliens (6th), The Color of Money (11th), Stand By Me (12th), Peggy Sue Got Married (18th), Platoon (23rd), Hannah and Her Sisters (29th), The Morning After (38th), The Color of Money (40th), and Crimes of the Heart (43rd) were nominated for Best Picture, directing, acting, or screenplay. The other top 50 box office hits that earned nominations were Top Gun (1st), The Karate Kid Part II (3rd), Star Trek IV: The Voyage Home (4th), An American Tail (5th), Heartbreak Ridge (17th), Poltergeist II: The Other Side (19th), The Fly (22nd), and Little Shop of Horrors (30th).

Critical reviews
The show received a mixed reception from media publications. Some media outlets were more critical of the show. Columnist Jerry Roberts of the Daily Breeze remarked "The whole mess was like some kind of geek show from a carnival row that had incestuously multiplied itself into a gargantuan sequin-lined ego battle royal accompanied by a firestorm of ballyhooing." Despite Chase and Hawn's best efforts to liven up the broadcast, he commented, "The lumbering procedure completely defeated them." Television critic Tom Shales of The Washington Post wrote, "As usual, the Academy Awards show was marked by missed cues, noisy moving scenery, plunging necklines, inane scripted chatter and, as has often happened in recent years, few galvanizing or gratifying surprises." He also quipped that the segment showcasing the Best Costume Design nominees slowed down the ceremony's pace. The Philadelphia Inquirers film critic Carrie Rickey observed, "As pace goes, the Academy Awards show was like watching a race between slugs and snails." She later wrote, "Oscarsclerosis is the show's most critical condition, the result of a telecast larded, once again, with too many Vegas-style production numbers."

Other media outlets received the broadcast more positively. Film critic John Hartl of The Seattle Times noted that the ceremony "was well-paced and filled with comics and comic film clips." He also complimented producer Goldwyn for hiring comics including host Chase and presenters such as Rodney Dangerfield for helping "to keep the show light and funny." The New York Times columnist Janet Maslin wrote, "This was the trimmest, most varied and best-paced program in years." She also commented that without the witty banter of hosts Hogan and Chase, "The show would have seemed notably lacking in luster." Television editor Michael Burkett of the Orange County Register commented, "Monday night's 59th installment was very nearly everything you could have wished it to be: quite entertaining, relatively fast-moving, unusually short on tastelessness and tackiness drenched in nostalgia, and featuring enough superbly chosen film clips for a monster round of Visual Trivial Pursuit.

Ratings and reception
The American telecast on ABC drew in an average of 37.19 million people over its length, which was a 2% decrease from the previous year's ceremony. However, the show drew higher Nielsen ratings compared to the previous ceremony with 27.5% of households watching over a 43 share. Many media outlets pointed out that the broadcast earned higher ratings compared to the final game of the 1987 NCAA Men's Division I Basketball Tournament which was airing on CBS that same night.

See also

7th Golden Raspberry Awards
29th Grammy Awards
39th Primetime Emmy Awards
40th British Academy Film Awards
41st Tony Awards
44th Golden Globe Awards
List of submissions to the 59th Academy Awards for Best Foreign Language Film

References

Bibliography

External links
Official websites
 Academy Awards Official website
 The Academy of Motion Picture Arts and Sciences Official website
 Oscar's Channel at YouTube (run by the Academy of Motion Picture Arts and Sciences)

Analysis
 1986 Academy Awards Winners and History Filmsite
 Academy Awards, USA: 1987 Internet Movie Database

Other resources
 

Academy Awards ceremonies
1986 film awards
1987 in Los Angeles
1987 in American cinema
March 1987 events in the United States
Academy
Television shows directed by Marty Pasetta